Calochortus macrocarpus, also known as sagebrush mariposa lily, is a North American species of bulbous perennials in the lily family.

Distribution
The plant is native to the Northwestern United States (Washington, Oregon, Idaho, and western Montana), northern California, northern Nevada, and a small area of southern British Columbia.  Habitats include the Great Basin and Cascade Range.

Description
Calochortus macrocarpus leaves are blue-green and grass-like.  The bulbs are tapering, like a carrot.

The flowers are large, one- to three-petaled, and are pink to purple. The sepals are about 2 inches long, slightly longer than the green-striped petals. They bloom in June.

Uses
First peoples in southern British Columbia harvested the bulbs from April to June.  They can be eaten raw or cooked.

References

External links
Jepson Manual Treatment of Calochortus macrocarpus
United States Department of AgriculturePlants Profile for Calochortus macrocarpus
Calphotos Photos gallery, University of California: Calochortus macrocarpus

macrocarpus
Flora of North America
Flora of the Cascade Range
Flora of the Great Basin
Plants described in 1828
Flora without expected TNC conservation status